Vernon Sanders Law (born March 12, 1930) is an American former baseball pitcher who played sixteen seasons in Major League Baseball (MLB) for the Pittsburgh Pirates. He played in 1950–51 and 1954–67. Law signed for the Pirates as an amateur free agent in 1948 and played for three of their minor league affiliates until 1950, when he was promoted to the major leagues.

Playing career
Law was born on March 12, 1930, in Meridian, Idaho. He was signed by the Pittsburgh Pirates before the 1948 season and spent 1948 and 1949 in the minor leagues. Law made his major league debut for the Pirates in 1950. He played one season and then served in the military from 1951 to 1954. Upon returning to the major leagues, he eventually earned a spot in the Pirates' starting rotation. He shared the NL Player of the Month award in August 1959 (4-0, 1.94 ERA, 25 SO) with Willie McCovey. 

In 1960, he had a win–loss record of 20-9 with a 3.08 earned run average. He led the National League in complete games, made the All-Star team, and won the Cy Young Award that season. In the 1960 World Series, he won two games to help the Pirates defeat the New York Yankees. His career was derailed by an injury to his ankle sustained on the bus trip on which the team was celebrating clinching the 1960 pennant. Law was forced to change his pitching style and pitched in pain for the rest of the season and the World Series. Because of his weak ankle, he tore some muscles in the back of his pitching shoulder during the Series. He thought the injury would heal over the winter, but he was not the same for several seasons. 

Law did manage to win the NL Comeback Player of the Year award in 1965, with a 17-9 record, and a 2.15 ERA in 29 games.  He shared the NL Player of the Month award in June of that year (with Willie Stargell), with a 6-1 record, 0.87 ERA, and 32 SO.  After two more seasons, he retired in 1967. Law finished his career with a record of 162-147. He won the Lou Gehrig Memorial Award in 1965 for his contributions both on and off the field. As a hitter, Law  posted a .216 batting average (191-for-883) with 96 runs, 35 doubles, 7 triples, 11 home runs, 90 RBI and drawing 41 bases on balls. In the 1960 World Series, he batted .333 (2-for-6) with a run scored and one RBI. He was better than average defensively, recording a .972 fielding percentage, which was 16 points higher than the league average at his position.

Coaching career
Following his retirement, Law served as the Pirates’ pitching coach for two seasons before becoming an assistant baseball coach at Brigham Young University, in which capacity he served for nine years, mentoring Jack Morris, among others. In December 1978, he accepted a position as pitching coach for the Seibu Lions of the Nippon Professional Baseball (NPB). Three years later, Law returned to the United States as a coach for the Portland Beavers of the Pacific Coast League, moving in 1983 to the Denver Bears of the American Association, where he would remain for one season before being handed the team's managerial reins in 1984. Law's promotion, however, proved short-lived when an extended midseason slump led to his dismissal on July 3, replaced by coach Adrian Garrett.

Personal life
Law was made a Deacon in the Church of Jesus Christ of Latter-day Saints at the age of 12, became a teacher two years later and was ordained a priest at 17. His son Vance Law also played in the Major Leagues.vernon law

See also
List of Major League Baseball players who spent their entire career with one franchise

References

External links

Vern Law at SABR (Baseball BioProject)

1930 births
Living people
American expatriate baseball people in Japan
Baseball coaches from Idaho
Baseball players from Idaho
BYU Cougars baseball coaches
Cy Young Award winners
Davenport Pirates players
Kinston Eagles players
Latter Day Saints from Idaho
Major League Baseball pitchers
Major League Baseball pitching coaches
Minor league baseball managers
National League All-Stars
New Orleans Pelicans (baseball) players
Nippon Professional Baseball coaches
Pittsburgh Pirates coaches
Pittsburgh Pirates players
People from Meridian, Idaho
Santa Rosa Pirates players